8th Wonder is the second album by rap group the Sugarhill Gang. The album was released in 1981 for Sugar Hill Records and was once again produced by Sylvia Robinson and James Cullimore. Though not as successful as the group's previous album, the album did feature the minor hits "8th Wonder" and "Apache" and featured an appearance by another Sugar Hill Records rap group, Grandmaster Flash and the Furious Five on "Showdown".

Commercial performance 
The album debuted at number 66 on Billboard's Soul LPs chart on January 16, 1982

Track listing

Charts

References 

1982 albums
The Sugarhill Gang albums